Burladingen is a town in the Zollernalbkreis district of Baden-Württemberg, Germany.

History
Hörschwag, was assigned to Reutlingen's district on 1 January 1973, but on 30 June 1974 was merged into Burladingen with the other townships. Burladingen was made an independent municipality in July 1978.

2008 flood
In the evening of 2 June 2008, three women drowned in the Starzel, near Burladingen, following heavy rainfalls and flooding across south-western Baden-Württemberg.

Geography
The township (Stadt) of Burladingen is located in the Swabian Jura, specifically where the  transitions into the western Jura.

The Federally-protected , Kornbühl, and  nature reserves are located in Burladingen's municipal area.

Coat of arms
Burladingen's coat of arms displays two silver keys, faced outward and away from each other, crossed over a black field. The pattern is derived from a 1702 seal, though the keys faced towards each other. This seal ceased to be used in the 19th century but was returned to official use around 1930, with the present pattern. Burladingen had a seal as early as 1534, making it the oldest in the County of Zollern, but it vanished from usage by 1541. The township was given the right to use a seal again in 1710 after an appeal to the Prince of Hohenzollern-Hechingen in 1702. The 1930 pattern was approved as the municipal coat of arms, with Zollern's black-white tincture, by the Federal Ministry of the Interior on 1 June 1956.

Deportation
Burladingen-Ziegelhütte:
 Josef Reinhardt ( 1913) – 15.03.1943)
 Agnes Zulie (* 1942 – 15.03.1943) 
 Elisabeth Regina Zulie (* 1920 – 15.03.1943)
 Elise Zulie ( 1922 – 15.03.1943)
 Hildegard Zulie (1943 – 15.03.1943)
 Olga Zulie ( 1940 – 15.03.1943)

References

External links

  (in German)

 
Towns in Baden-Württemberg